Harpalus basilewskyi is a species of ground beetle in the subfamily Harpalinae. It was described by Facchini in 2003.

References

basilewskyi
Beetles described in 2003